This is a list of threatened plant and animal species in the Philippines as classified by the International Union for Conservation of Nature (IUCN). It includes vulnerable (VU), endangered (EN), critically endangered (CR), and recently extinct (EX) species. It excludes near threatened (NT), data deficient (DD), and prehistoric species.

Animals

The following is a list of animal species classified as threatened:

Vulnerable

Endangered

Critically endangered

Plants

The following is a list of plant species classified as threatened:

Vulnerable

Endangered

Critically endangered

See also

 National List of Threatened Terrestrial Fauna of the Philippines
 Katala Foundation
 Haribon Foundation
 List of endemic birds of the Philippines
 List of mammals of the Philippines
 Wild pigs of the Philippines

General:
 Wildlife of the Philippines
 Environmental issues in the Philippines

References

External links
Katala Foundation
Haribon Foundation

Threatened
Philippines
Philippines
.
.Philippines
.
Philippines